Ethacridine lactate (ethacridine monolactate monohydrate, acrinol, trade name Rivanol) is an aromatic organic compound based on acridine. Its formal name is 2-ethoxy-6,9-diaminoacridine monolactate monohydrate.  It forms orange-yellow crystals with a melting point of 226 °C and it has a stinging smell.

Its primary use is as an antiseptic in solutions of 0.1%. It is effective against mostly Gram-positive bacteria, such as Streptococci and Staphylococci, but ineffective against Gram-negative bacteria such as Pseudomonas aeruginosa.

Ethacridine is also used as an agent for second trimester abortion.  Up to 150 ml of a 0.1% solution is instilled extra-amniotically using a foley catheter. After 20 to 40 hours, 'mini labor' ensues.  In China, an intra-amniotic method has also been used.  Ethacridine as an abortifacient is found to be safer and better tolerated than 20% hypertonic saline.

References 

Antiseptics
Lactates
Acridines
Phenol ethers
Aromatic amines